Italian Americans have been highly influential on American cinema, notably as directors, but also as actors, producers and screenwriters.

Notable directors 

 Alan Alda
 Lucia Aniello
 Greg Antonacci
 Emile Ardolino
 Paul Attanasio
 Edoardo Ballerini
 Joseph Barbera
 Richard Benedict
 Andrew Berardini
 Adam Bernstein
 Matt Bettinelli-Olpin
 Mike Birbiglia
 Lizzy Borden
 Frank Borzage
 Steve Buscemi
 Tom Byron
 Antonio Campos
 Giovanni Capitello
 Frank Capra
 Don Capria
 John Carluccio
 D.J. Caruso
 Damian Chapa
 David Chase
 Matt Cimber
 Michael Cimino
 Chris Columbus
 Marjorie Conrad
 Jackie Cooper
 Christopher Coppola
 Francis Ford Coppola
 Gia Coppola
 Roman Coppola
 Sofia Coppola
 Frank Coraci
 Don Coscarelli
 Adamo Paolo Cultraro
 Philip D'Antoni
 Gerard Damiano
 Frank De Felitta
 Robert De Niro
 Brian De Palma
 Michael DeLuise
 William DeMeo
 James DeMonaco
 Danny DeVito
 Denise Di Novi
 Tom DiCillo
 Anthony DiMaria
 Vincent D'Onofrio
 Illeana Douglas
 Ben Falcone
 Jon Favreau
 Anthony C. Ferrante
 Abel Ferrara
 Soleil Moon Frye
 Vincent Gallo
 Tony Giglio
 Frank D. Gilroy
 Tony Gilroy
 Bob Giraldi
 Caroline Giuliani
 Francesca Gregorini
 James William Guercio
 Anthony Michael Hall
 Alexandra Hedison
 Anjelica Huston
 John Mese
 Ariana Jollee
 Sebastian Junger
 John Krokidas
 Gregory La Cava
 Richard LaGravenese
 Frank LaLoggia
 Walter Lantz
 John Lavachielli
 John Leslie
 Joe Lipari
 Robert Longo
 William Lustig
 Albert Magnoli
 Julie Mallozzi
 Don Mancini
 Garry Marshall
 Penny Marshall
 Scott Marshall
 Gregori J. Martin
 Armand Mastroianni
 Theodore Melfi
 Vincente Minnelli
 Kate and Laura Mulleavy
 Nica Noelle
 Steve Oedekerk
 Joe Oriolo
 Al Pacino
 Tom Palmer
 Chazz Palminteri
 Matt Pizzolo
 Edoardo Ponti
 Derek Estlin Purvis
 Kym Ragusa
 Yvonne Rainer
 Chris Reccardi
 Godfrey Reggio
 Rob Renzetti
 James Rolfe
 Bonnie Rotten
 Tao Ruspoli
 David O. Russell
 Russo brothers
 Tony Salerno
 Bettina Santo Domingo
 Tom Savini
 Nancy Savoca
 Lorene Scafaria
 John Scagliotti
 Antonia Scarpa
 Martin Scorsese
 Gary Sinise
 Steven Soderbergh
 Vincent Spano
 John Stagliano
 Sylvester Stallone
 Michael Stefano
 Connie Stevens
 Tony Stevens
 Quentin Tarantino
 Chris Terrio
 Joey Travolta
 Adriana Trigiani
 Stanley Tucci
 John Turturro
 Nick Vallelonga
 Robert G. Vignola
 Antonio Zarro
 Robert Zemeckis

See also
List of Italian Americans
List of Italian-American actors
List of Italian American entertainers
List of Italian-American television characters

References

Film directors
Film directors
Italian American
Italian